Rolf Koskinen (July 21, 1939 – January 8, 2010) was a Finnish orienteering competitor and European champion. He won a gold medal with the Finnish relay team at the 1964 European Orienteering Championships in Le Brassus. He was also member of the Finnish team that won the relay at the 1962 European championships, while not part of the official program.

He received a silver medal in the relay at the 1966 World Orienteering Championships with the Finnish team, and again in 1968.

See also
 Finnish orienteers
 List of orienteers
 List of orienteering events

References

1939 births
2010 deaths
Finnish orienteers
Male orienteers
Foot orienteers
World Orienteering Championships medalists
Swedish-speaking Finns